Players in bold have later been capped at full international level.

Group A

Head coach:

Head coach: José Augusto

Head coach:
Liam Touhy

Head coach:

Group B

Head coach:

Head coach:

Head coach:

Head coach:  Henryk Apostel

Group C

Head coach:

Head coach:

Darren Bradley MF 24/11/1965 Aston Villa Football Club England
Mark Robert Brennan MF 04/10/1965 Ispwich Town Football Team England

Head coach:

Head coach:

Group D

Head coach:

Head coach: Bertalan Bicskei

Head coach:

Head coach:

References

1984